See Amrapur for namesakes

Amrapur is a town and former petty princely state in Jamnagar, in Kathiawar, Gujarat state, western India.

Village 
Most inhabitants are farmers. Some of them are connected with animal husbandry. Mr Vijaybhai Borsadiya is currently sarpanch of the village‍.

Location 
Amrapur is surrounded on three sides by a dam. 
Amrapur is located at  On Globe.
The road to it is from Kalavad to Ranuja, Dhutarpur, Sumary, Kharavedha, Amrapur.

Statistics 
 Population (approx): 250
 Buildings (approx): 25
 Temples: 3
 Shops: 2
 Primary School:1

History 

Amrapur was the seat of an eponymous non-salute princely state in Halar prant, comprising it and another village on Saurashtra peninsula in present Gujarat, western India. It was ruled by Muslim Chieftains of a Shaikh family.

It had a population of 1210 in 1901, yielding a state revenue of 8,000 Rupees (all from land, 1903-4) and paying 511 Rupees to the British.

Photo gallery

External links and Sources 
 The official Facebook page of village
 Imperial gazetteer, on dsal.uchicago.edu - Kathiawar

References 

Villages in Jamnagar district